Eriastrum eremicum, the desert woollystar, is an annual plant in the phlox family (Polemoniaceae) found in the Sonoran Desert. It often grows in great abundance covering the desert floor in a blanket of sky blue color.

References

eremicum
Flora of the Sonoran Deserts